The Good, the Bad, and the Dead (stylized on-screen as 4Got10) is a 2015  American action thriller film directed by Timothy Woodward Jr., and starring Johnny Messner, Dolph Lundgren, Danny Trejo, Vivica A. Fox, and Michael Paré. The film follows Brian Barns, a man who wakes up in the middle of the desert with no memory of who he is. Surrounded by eight dead bodies, $3 million in cash and a van full of cocaine, Barns is pursued by a DEA agent, a corrupt sheriff, and a Mexican drug lord.

Plot
Brian Barns wakes up in the middle of the desert injured and with no memory of who he is. Surrounded by eight dead bodies, $3 million in cash, and a van full of cocaine, he is pursued by drug lord Mateo Perez, who wants his drugs and money back; DEA agent Bob Rooker; and Sheriff Olson, who is corrupt and out for his own financial gain.

Cast

 Johnny Messner as Brian Barns
 Dolph Lundgren as Agent Bob Rooker
 Danny Trejo as Mateo Perez
 Vivica A. Fox as Imani Cole
 Michael Paré as Sheriff Olson
 Michael J. Long as Deputy Samuel Perez
 Natassia Malthe as Christine
 John Laughlin as Howard
 Angell Conwell as Agent Taylor
 Chris Jai Alex as Agent Black
 Erin O'Brien as Jesse
 Jon Foo as Officer
 Stefania Spampinato as Sarah Barns
 Jayde Rossi as News Reporter
 Leonel Claude as Morgue Technician
 Josh Berger as Eric
 Braxton Davis as Agent Mic
 Stephen Brown as Officer Mike
 Slim Khezri as Detective
 Klement Tinaj as Detective

References

External links
 
 

2015 films
2015 crime thriller films
2015 action thriller films
American action thriller films
American crime thriller films
Films about Mexican drug cartels
Films about amnesia
2010s English-language films
Films directed by Timothy Woodward Jr.
2010s American films
2010s Mexican films